Aristotelia coeruleopictella is a moth of the family Gelechiidae. It is found in the Russian Far East.

References

Moths described in 1920
Aristotelia (moth)
Moths of Asia